The Museum of African Art is a museum located in the urban neighborhood of Senjak, Belgrade, the capital city of Serbia.

History
The museum was founded in 1977 and represents the only museum in the country dedicated to the arts and culture of Africa. Most of its collection comes from the West Africa.

The museum specializes in African art, and predominantly features African masks. It was established from the private collection of Croatian diplomat in service of the Socialist Federal Republic of Yugoslavia Zdravko Pečar (born in Međimurje), and was a result of his long stay as Ambassador to Africa. The collection contains many rare and valuable pieces from the regions in which he travelled. The collection was bequeathed to the City of Belgrade in 1974 by the ambassador.

Since its initial establishment from Pečar's private collection, the museum has continually expanded its collection and as of 2006 contains approximately 1,700 pieces.

Gallery

See also
Yugoslavia and the Organisation of African Unity

References

External links
 
 About the museum on Belgrade's official website 
 

Museums in Belgrade
African art museums
Art museums established in 1977
Museum of African Art (Belgrade)
Art museums and galleries in Serbia
Savski Venac